Murkowski ( often Anglicised to ; feminine: Murkowska, plural: Murkowscy) is a surname of Polish language origin. Notable people with the surname include: 

Frank Murkowski (born 1933), U.S. politician, Senator (1981–2002) and Governor of Alaska (2002–2006), father of Lisa Murkowski
Lisa Murkowski (born 1957), incumbent Senator from Alaska (since 2002), daughter of Frank Murkowski 

Polish-language surnames